Vuthithorn "Woody" Milintachinda (born 25 November 1976) is a Thai content creator, TV and online content host, and executive producer.

Woody is a leading figure on the front line of the Thai entertainment industry. With close to two decades of experience in radio and on TV as the nation's top talk show host, he has transformed his role into one of the most powerful social media influencers and thought leaders in Thailand across the whole demographic spectrum. He is the founder of large-scale music and entertainment events such as the S2O Music Festival, The Bangkok Countdown, and Circuit Asia, as well as Thailand’s first Health and Fitness Festival, FIT FEST.

In his diverse roles in entertainment and media as DJ, VJ, TV host, actor, and producer, Woody has represented Thailand in interviews with world-famous figures and celebrities including the Dalai Lama Tenzin Gyatso and David Beckham. Woody recently hosted Woody Show which is the first licensed format show of The Ellen DeGeneres Show in Asia airing 17.00-18.00 every Sunday on Channel 7. Woody Milintachinda is a leading show host and one of the most powerful social media influencers leading Thailand across the whole demographic spectrum. 

Woody was selected by CNN as one of Asia’s Top 100 Influential Personalities. With the support of the Thai government, he championed a national health awareness campaign called the "60 Day Challenge" and continues to create content to improve health awareness for the general public and continues to use his influence as a public figure to raise awareness on an array of charitable issues.

Early life and education
He graduated from a high school in New York City and then moved back to Thailand to finish his bachelor's degree from Thammasat University (major in International Economics) and master's degree from Chulalongkorn University (major in Mass Communication). Woody's father, Piamsak Milintachinda, is an ambassador, while his brother Pulin Milintachinda is a former diplomat.

Career

His career started in 2000; he joined 88 Peak FM as the nation's first bilingual DJ. In 2003, he became a VJ at MTV Thailand. In 2004, Woody founded his own company under the name Double U Network Co., Ltd. In 2009 it was renamed Woody World Co., Ltd. Woody not only acts as president of the company but also as a host of its shows. Woody's television hosting credits include The One, Music X-Change, I-DNA, MTV's Just Arrived, Unseen TV, Pak Tor Pak, and MTV Just Talk. However, his most successful show is The Woody Show or Woody Kerd Ma Kui which was aired in early 2008. Though not a conventional talk show, it would lead the audience to unexpected stories about celebrities that might not be told anywhere else. The Woody Show aired every Sunday night at 10:30 pm on Channel 9, Modernine TV, Thailand's leading terrestrial network.

In 2010, Woody started to produce a show called Woody Daily or Chao Doo Woody (since renamed to Wake Up to Talk or Tuen Ma Kuii, Thai: ตื่นมาคุย) which airs 5 days a week at 8:00 to 8:45 am on Channel 9, Modernine TV. It differs from his previous shows in that he discussed daily "talk of the town".

Among the world's top celebrities he's had television exclusives with are Yến Trang, Will Smith, David Beckham, Britney Spears, Red Hot Chili Peppers, Linkin Park, Coldplay, Baz Lurrman, Rain, F4, Colin Farrell, Alicia Keys, Missy Elliott, Jay Chou, Jamiroquai, Amitabh Bachchan, Jackie Chan, the Twilight Saga cast, Choi Siwon from Super Junior, Nichkhun Horvejkul from 2PM, JYJ, Enrique Iglesias, Hugh Jackman, Maria Ozawa, Michelle Yeoh, and Trịnh Tú Trung.

One of the great opportunities, Woody has interviewed Princess Chulabhorn Walailak of Thailand. It was a rare occasion for a Thai audience to see her on a talk show. Headlined in local newspapers several days ahead, the famous talk show Woody Kerd Ma Kui on Channel 9 recently aired an exclusive royal interview with HRH Princess Chulabhorn Walailak, the youngest daughter of HM King Bhumibol Adulyadej. She reflected that royalty was not to be viewed as a fairy tale but as hard work. Hosted by Woody Milintachinda, the show has become one of the most highly rated and influential talk shows in the country.  It is known for its exclusive interviews of controversial public figures and topics that penetrate into Thai pop-cultural consciousness, and for Woody's bold style of direct questioning. These features of the show had heightened the anticipation for this particular interview.

Not only be known in Thailand but Woody is also well-known all over countries in Asia. He has been nominated for Best Entertainment Present at the Asian Television Awards. He was also picked by CNN to be included in Asia's Top 100 Influential Personalities list.

Show Host: TV and Online

Personal life
In 2016, Woody revealed in his talk show that he was gay and he married his long-term boyfriend two years ago, which initially brought huge backlash of homophobia.

Awards

References

External links

 

Thai television personalities
Living people
Woody Milintachinda
1976 births
Social media influencers
Woody Milintachinda